Kay Rosen (born 1943, Corpus Christi, TX) is an American painter. Rosen's paintings are included in the collections of the Art Institute of Chicago, the Museum of Contemporary Art, Los Angeles, and the Museum of Modern Art and Whitney Museum of American Art in New York City. Rosen lives in Gary, Indiana, and New York.

Education 
Rosen received her BA in Linguistics, Spanish, and French from Newcomb College of Tulane University in 1965. She attended graduate school in Linguistics and Spanish at Northwestern University, and then taught Spanish at Indiana University in Gary. While she was teaching in Gary, Rosen began taking studio art courses at the School of the Art Institute of Chicago, where she currently teaches.

Works 
Rosen's artwork is largely text-based, employing "formalism, linguistics, and humor to reveal content that is hidden within both the structural nature of written language and the ways in which meaning can be generated through the manipulation of text."  The artist is interested in expressing language visually, and she focuses primarily on wordplay. Many of her works are representations of words in which certain letters have been juxtaposed or rendered in different colors or scales in order to reveal hidden messages or to draw attention to the relationship between language and meaning. These features of Rosen's style, known as word art can be seen in Untitled Grid at the Indianapolis Museum of Art and in The Whitney Museum of American Art's Spare Parts.

In some works, language becomes structure, "with words and letterforms functioning as building blocks, and where, through unusual typographic arrangements, words and phrases can embody the thing they are describing". Her precisionist-style works span in size from mural- to laptop-sized. Rosen's work frequently veers into commentary on the U.S. political condition, often deploying wit and humor.

Exhibitions 
In addition to works created for gallery spaces, Rosen is known for publicly presenting work in the form of outdoor murals. The piece "Blurred" was exhibited along Interstate 70 as a part of the I-70 Sign Show. It was first located near Hatton, Missouri then moved to Warrenton, Missouri. The blurring of colors in text were interpreted as a statement related to political divides between Missouri's rural and urban populations. Blurred (2004)  is currently in the collection at the Art Gallery of New South Wales.

Solo exhibitions of Rosen's work have been presented at the following museums and nonprofit art institutions:

 Witte de With (Center for Contemporary Art), Rotterdam, The Netherlands (1990)
 Indianapolis Museum of Art (1994)
 Museum of Contemporary Art, Chicago (1994)
 Unlimited Contemporary Art, Athens, Greece (1996)
 M.I.T. List Visual Arts Center, Cambridge, Massachusetts (1997)
 Beaver College Art Gallery (now Arcadia University), Philadelphia (1998)
 Museum of Contemporary Art (MOCA) and Otis College of Art and Design, Los Angeles (1998–99)
 Aspen Art Museum, Aspen, Colorado (2001)
 The Drawing Center, New York (2002)
 Dunedin Public Art Gallery, New Zealand (2004)
 University Art Museum, University of California at Santa Barbara (2004)
 Art Institute of Chicago (2011)
 Taubman Museum of American Art, Roanoke, Virginia (2011)
 Contemporary Art Gallery, Vancouver, Canada (2013)
 Art Gallery of New South Wales, Sydney, Australia (2014)
 The Aldrich Contemporary Art Museum, Ridgefield, Connecticut (2017)
 Object:Paradise : Now Showing, Prague, Czech Republic (2020)

Awards 
Rosen is the recipient of the following awards:

 John Simon Guggenheim Fellowship in Fine Arts, 2017
 Artist Award for a Distinguished Body of Work, presented by the CAA (College Art Association), 2014
 S.J. Weiler Fund Award, 2013
 Anonymous Was a Woman Foundation Grant, 2009
 National Endowment for the Arts Visual Arts Grant, 1995
 Award in the Visual Arts 10 Fellowship, 1990
 National Endowment for the Arts Visual Arts Grant, 1989
 National Endowment for the Arts Visual Arts Grant, 1987

References

1949 births
American women painters
Living people
20th-century American painters
20th-century American women artists
21st-century American painters
21st-century American women artists
Tulane University alumni
Northwestern University alumni
School of the Art Institute of Chicago alumni
Indiana University faculty
School of the Art Institute of Chicago faculty
People from Corpus Christi, Texas
Painters from Texas